Baron Lucy (anciently Lucie or Luci) is a title that has been created four times, three times by tenure and once by writ, which means that the peerages could descend through both male and female lines. The first creation by tenure came in the 12th century with Chief Justiciar Richard de Luci. In 1320, the title Baron Lucy was created in the Peerage of England by writ of summons dated 15 May 1320. The title Baron Lucy has been dormant since 1398.

Barons de Lucy

Barons de Lucy (also Lucie or Luci) by tenure
 Richard de Luci, Governor of Faleis (Normandy), Lord of Diss, Chief Justiciar of England (died 1179)
 Richard de Luci, son of Geoffrey de Luci, 2nd and last Baron Lucy by tenure (died ante 1196)

Barons de Lucy/Luci (of Egremont) by tenure 
 Reginald de Luci, Lord of Egremont (died ante 1199)
 Richard de Luci, Reginald's son, Lord of Egremont (died 1213)

Barons de Lucy (of Cockermouth) by writ (1320)
 Anthony de Lucy, 1st Baron Lucy (died 1343)
 Thomas de Lucy, 2nd Baron Lucy (Anthony's son; d. 1365)
 Anthony de Lucy, 3rd Baron Lucy (d. 1368)
 Joan de Lucy, 4th Baroness Lucy (daughter of Anthony, 3rd Baron; d. 1369 in infancy)
 Maud de Umfraville, 5th Baroness Lucy, Countess of Angus (sister of Anthony, 3rd Baron; d.1398). Following her death on 24 December 1398 the peerage became dormant.

See also
 De Lucy

Notes

References

Lucy pedigree, http://www.lucey.net/webpage10.htm

Bibliography
 John Burke, A general and heraldic dictionary of the peerages of England, Ireland, and Scotland, extinct, dormant, and in abeyance, Henry Colburn & Richard Bentley, London 1831
 Nicholas Harris, William Courthope, The historic peerage of England, John Murray, London 1857

1320 establishments in England
Dormant baronies in the Peerage of England
Noble titles created in 1320